Jean-Yves Cartier (born June 18, 1949) is a Canadian former professional ice hockey defenceman.

During the 1972–73 season, Cartier played 15 games in the World Hockey Association with the Quebec Nordiques.

References

External links

1949 births
Living people
Canadian ice hockey defencemen
French Quebecers
Maine Nordiques players
Michigan Wolverines men's ice hockey players
People from Verdun, Quebec
Quebec Nordiques (WHA) players
Rhode Island Eagles players
Ice hockey people from Montreal